Sara is a province in the Santa Cruz Department, Bolivia. Its capital is Portachuelo.

Subdivision 
The province is divided into three municipalities which are further subdivided into cantons.

Provinces of Santa Cruz Department (Bolivia)